Mephisto Lake is a lake in the Trent River and Lake Ontario drainage basins.

The primary inflow is Mephisto Creek at the northeast. There are also four unnamed creek inflows: one at the north from Mawson Lake, one at the east, and two at the south, one of which comes from the direction of Cashel Lake. The primary outflow is a channel to Dark Lake, which flows via Dixon Creek, Beaver Creek, the Crowe River and the Trent River to the Bay of Quinte on Lake Ontario at Trenton.

See also
List of lakes in Ontario

References

Lakes of Hastings County